Akmarzhan Kalmurzayeva (born 25 December 1995) is a Kazakhstani freestyle skier. She competed in the 2018 Winter Olympics.

References

1995 births
Living people
Freestyle skiers at the 2018 Winter Olympics
Freestyle skiers at the 2022 Winter Olympics
Kazakhstani female freestyle skiers
Olympic freestyle skiers of Kazakhstan
21st-century Kazakhstani women